India-Malta relations are the diplomatic relations between India and Malta. Malta opened a High Commission in New Delhi in 2007. with Consulates in Chennai, Mumbai and Kolkata. In early 2018 India established a High Commission at St Venera in Malta. Both countries are members of the Commonwealth of Nations.

History
The political relations between the nations of Malta and India stretch back many years even before the two became independent nations. With the arrival of Britain to Malta in 1800 AD Maltese were taken to India by Britain. Many Maltese dead lie buried in Indian graveyards. Maltese Catholic missionaries followed Maltese soldiers into India. In 1878, the British controlled Indian government dispatched 7000 Indian troops to the island of Malta.

In 1924, Maltese Catholic Missionaries established themselves among the Santhal tribes in Dumka, Jharkhand, India. Over 73 Maltese Catholic priests have lived in India since 1924. In WWl Malta was used by the British for treating the wounded and for rehabilitating the injured. There is a Memorials at Pietà Military Cemetery to twenty eight Indians who fought for the British in World War I and died of wounds or illness in Malta. Entry to Pieta Military Cemetery is by Triq II-Principessa Melita. The bodies of 13 Indian soldiers and seven men of the Indian Labour Corps, who died in Malta, were cremated at the Lazzaretto Cemetery on Manoel Island. Some of the Indians who died in Malta are Rifleman Dadrat Gurung, Havildar Jitbhadhur Thapa, Daffadar (Sergeant) Bal Ram, Driver Moti Lal, Driver Jai Ram and Labourer Khew Marak. Throughout World War II, the British used Malta as hub to bring Indian troops to and from the Atlantic. India was one of the first countries to recognize the independence of Malta in 1964. India established diplomatic relationship with Malta in 1965. A High Commission of India was opened in Malta in 1993 but was later closed in 2002. In 2018 India reopened a High Commission at Triq Galanton Vassallo, St Venera in Malta.

According to a United Nations trade agreement, the two nations meet at least once annually to discuss economic, industrial, scientific and technological trade as well as other relationship issues.
As part of the United Nations treaty both nations decided to establish stronger cultural ties. Added both nations agreed to honour each other's cultural heritage and promote cultural ties in each other's countries.

Diasporas

A renowned Maltese  lived and worked  in India in the 16th century CE. That was around the period of Emperor Akbar's reign of India. India was the leading global economy at that time. Links of India with nearby Roman Empire date back to before the rule of Emperor Augustus in Rome that is well recorded
With the start of British rule in  Malta in 1800 CE, Maltese went to India during the mass exodus out of Malta in the early 19th Century. A few Maltese in India fought alongside Britain against  Indian freedom fighters and Princely states. Maltese Catholic missionaries followed Maltese soldiers to India. In 1924, Maltese Catholic Missionaries set themselves up among the Santhal tribes in Dumka in Jharkhand state of India for aim of spread of Catholicism and for conversions. Seventy three Maltese priests have lived in India since 1924 and a few are still there. With the new strict visa rules coming into force in India, Maltese missionaries' entry into India is now restricted. There are several Maltese residents in India supported by the Maltese Consulate in New Delhi, Mumbai, Chennai and Kolkata that provide Consular service to them. Maltese firms like Malta Enterprises have a presence in India. In 2007, there were around 200 Non-Resident Indians living in Malta. The number of Maltese living in India is unknown.

Malta has a well-established small traders community of about 45 Sindhi Indian families, that traces its roots to migration of Sindhi traders starting around 1887 under British colonial rule of Malta. Malta did not attract people from any other part of India although Maltese have a continued presence in India since 1800 AD. While both countries were under British rule, Malta served as a convenient trading node for exporting silk and curios from India and Far East to places around the Mediterranean and South America. Although India has a long history of trading in the region that dates back  to before the rule of Roman Emperor Augustus in Rome. Trade between India and the Roman empire is well documented. However following India's independence, and due to strict immigration laws in Malta, not a single Indian is said to have emigrated to Malta between 1952 and 1985. However apart from the Sindhis no Indian from any other part of India showed any interest in Malta. During the doctors strike in Malta some years ago a few Indian doctors were recruited to run Malta's health services. All the Indian doctors recruited returned back home. The traders of Indian descent in Malta belong to the Sindhi community and are locally known as l-Indjani ("the Indians"). The community  maintains  Indian traditions in Malta, such as privately organising celebrations of Diwali, Holi Onam and other Hindu festivals. Though once isolated, it is now somewhat integrated into Maltese society and regarded as a local minority. Indians living in Malta keep a low profile in Maltese society. The Indian community meets at following address: 1st floor, 'Sukh Sagar', 'The Maltese-Indian Community Centre', 25 Triq Bella Vista, San Gwann SGN 2690 , 

Hinduism In Malta
Catholic Malta does not recognize Hinduism as a religion. Hinduism and religions of India origin are described as cults. There are no Hindu temples and the Hindu deceased are buried instead of being cremated which is very upsetting to the global Hindu community.

Economic relations

The Maltese government encourages Indian firms to set up business in Malta. In order to attract Indian businesses Malta has offered various incentives to Indian companies. Malta has also signed a bilateral trade agreement with the Indian government, for the avoidance of double taxation.

High level visits
Maltese Prime Minister Eddie Fenech Adami visited India in 1989. India and Malta later exchanged presidential visits: Indian President Ramaswamy Venkataraman visited Malta in 1990, and Maltese President Ċensu Tabone visited India in 1992. In March 2005, Maltese Foreign Minister Michael Frendo visited India for a period of six days.

In November 2013, the Maltese Foreign Minister George Vella met Shri Salman Khurshid, on the side-lines of ASEM meeting in New Delhi. In February 2015 (05-07), Leo Brincat, Minister for Sustainable Development visited India to participate in the Delhi Sustainable Development Summit.

In January 2019, the Prime Minister of Malta, Joseph Muscat visited India where he met the Prime Minister of India, Narendra Modi at the Vibrant Gujarat Global Summit. During this visit, the two Prime Ministers had a meeting  which was aimed at heightened Indian investment in Malta in the IT and Pharmaceutical sectors.

See also 
 Foreign relations of Malta
 Foreign relations of India
 India and the Non-Aligned Movement
 Malta and the Non-Aligned Movement
 Hinduism in Malta

Bibliography 
Mark-Anthony Falzon, Origins and establishment of the Indian Business Community in Malta, Bank of Valletta Review, No. 24, Autumn 2001

References

External links 
 High Commission of Malta in New Delhi
 Ministry of Foreign Affairs of Malta
 Malta Media article on trade

Bilateral relations of Malta
Malta
Malta
Malta and the Commonwealth of Nations